Henryk Bromowicz (22 February 1924 – 30 December 1982), was a Polish ice hockey player. He played for HKS Siemianowiczanka, RKS Sile Giszowiec, and Legia Warsaw during his career. He also played for the Polish national team at the 1948, 1952, and 1956 Winter Olympics, and three world championships, in 1947, 1955, and 1957. After his playing career he turned to coaching.

References

External links
 

1924 births
1982 deaths
Ice hockey players at the 1948 Winter Olympics
Ice hockey players at the 1952 Winter Olympics
Ice hockey players at the 1956 Winter Olympics
Legia Warsaw (ice hockey) players
Olympic ice hockey players of Poland
Podhale Nowy Targ players
Polish ice hockey coaches
Polish ice hockey defencemen
Sportspeople from Katowice